Paratorna seriepuncta is a species of moth of the family Tortricidae. It is found in Korea, China and eastern Asia.

The wingspan is 16 mm for both males and females.

Taxonomy
Some sources list the species as a synonym of Paratorna catenulella.

References

Moths described in 1882
Tortricini